Tinus is a genus of nursery web spiders that was first described by Frederick Octavius Pickard-Cambridge in 1901.

Species
 it contains eleven species, found in Central America, the United States, Mexico, India, Cuba, and on the Greater Antilles:
Tinus arindamai Biswas & Roy, 2005 – India
Tinus connexus (Bryant, 1940) – Cuba, Hispaniola
Tinus minutus F. O. Pickard-Cambridge, 1901 – Mexico to El Salvador
Tinus nigrinus F. O. Pickard-Cambridge, 1901 (type) – Mexico to Costa Rica
Tinus oaxaca Carico, 2008 – Mexico
Tinus palictlus Carico, 1976 – Mexico
Tinus peregrinus (Bishop, 1924) – USA, Mexico
Tinus prusius Carico, 1976 – Mexico
Tinus schlingeri Silva, 2012 – Mexico
Tinus tibialis F. O. Pickard-Cambridge, 1901 – Mexico
Tinus ursus Carico, 1976 – Costa Rica, Panama

See also
 List of Pisauridae species

References

Araneomorphae genera
Pisauridae
Spiders of the Indian subcontinent
Spiders of North America
Taxa named by Frederick Octavius Pickard-Cambridge